Dennis Dechmann Sørensen (sometimes Sörensen) (born 24 May 1981 in Herlev) is a retired Danish professional footballer.

Career
From 2000 to 2003, he played 23 games and scored two goals for the Denmark national under-21 football team. He started his senior career for Farum BK (later known as FC Nordsjælland) in 1999, before moving to FC Midtjylland in 2004. In 2007, he moved to FC Energie Cottbus where he played 128 matches and scored 15 goals, before returning to Denmark in 2013, to play for FC Vestsjælland. He played his first game for FCV against Brøndby IF on 21 July 2013. Sørensen scored a goal and the game ended 1–1.

Sørensen had his first cap for the Danish national football team on 11 October 2006 vs. Liechtenstein.

References

Dennis Sørensen stopper karrieren‚ bold.dk, 27 May 2016

External links
Danish national team profile 
 
 Official Danish Superliga stats 
 

1981 births
Living people
Expatriate footballers in Germany
Danish men's footballers
Denmark international footballers
Denmark under-21 international footballers
FC Nordsjælland players
FC Midtjylland players
Danish Superliga players
FC Energie Cottbus players
FC Vestsjælland players
Bundesliga players
2. Bundesliga players
Association football midfielders
Association football forwards
People from Herlev Municipality
Sportspeople from the Capital Region of Denmark